FitzPatrick 1932 is an early paper in the field of bankruptcy prediction.  In a series of three articles in the monthly The Certified Public Accountant in 1932, Paul J. FitzPatrick presented data for 20 matched pairs of firms and discussed accounting ratios as indicators of bankruptcy.  It is historically significant as an early attempt in this field, and it is notable also for its publishing a data set, now in the public domain.  Beaver (1968), an important paper in accounting research which employs statistical analysis to a similar matched sample, cites the paper.

The dataset includes 13 accounting ratios calculated for 40 firms for each of three years.  However some fields are missing for some firm-year observations.

Sample selection

Example data

Analysis and discussion

References
FitzPatrick, Paul J., Ph.D.  1932. "A Comparison of the Ratios of Successful Industrial Enterprises With Those of Failed Companies". The Certified Public Accountant
Beaver 1968. Journal of Accounting Research.  (In three issues: October, 1932, p. 598-605; November, 1932, p. 656-662; December, 1932, p. 727-731.

Bankruptcy